Artilleryman was an Australian bred Thoroughbred racehorse that won the 1919 Melbourne Cup.

Background
Artilleryman's sire was the 1910 Melbourne Cup winner, Comedy King, the first British bred horse to win the race.

Racing career
In winning the 1919 Melbourne Cup, Artilleryman set a new race record time of 3 minutes 24.5 seconds. This was also the first year that the current three-handled Loving Cup trophy was presented to the winning owner.

Artilleryman died in 1921 after suffering an internal haemorrhage whilst spelling in Bacchus Marsh, Victoria.

Pedigree

References

Melbourne Cup winners
1916 racehorse births
Racehorses bred in Australia
Racehorses trained in Australia
1921 racehorse deaths